Toto in Madrid is an Italian comedy film from 1959, directed by Steno, written by Vittorio Metz, starring Totò and Louis de Funès. The film is known under the titles: "Toto in Madrid" (English title), "Totò a Madrid", "Un coup fumant" (France), "La culpa fue de Eva" (Spain).

Plot 
The penniless painter Toto is commissioned by unknown Spanish fraudsters to mirror the famous masterpiece Maja Desnuda by Francisco Goya, with some details. In fact, these thieves have agreed with a rich billionaire who plans to buy the original masterpiece. When Toto discovers that all that was nothing more than a scam, it's too late...

Cast

References

External links 
 
 Totò, Eva e il pennello proibito (1959) at the Films de France 

1959 films
Italian comedy films
1950s Italian-language films
Italian black-and-white films
Films directed by Stefano Vanzina
1959 comedy films
1950s Italian films